César Pérez (César Pérez Segovia; born 7 April 1975) is a Spanish long-distance runner who specializes in the 3000 m steeplechase.

He won the 2003 Summer Universiade and the 2004 Ibero-American Athletics Championship, he also finished eighth at the 2006 European Athletics Championships.

After his athletic career he became coach of Marta Domínguez. He was named 2009 Best Spanish newcomer track Coach, (RFEA), Royal Spanish Track and Field Federation.

Achievements

Personal bests
3000 Metres Indoor         	 7:49.43		 Valencia, ESP	 11 FEB 2006
2000 Metres Steeplechase	 5:32.28		 Barcelona, ESP	 11 JUL 2003
3000 Metres Steeplechase	 8:13.06		 Huelva, ESP   	 20 JUN 2006

References
 
 RFEA profile

1975 births
Living people
Spanish male long-distance runners
Spanish male steeplechase runners
Universiade medalists in athletics (track and field)
Universiade gold medalists for Spain
Medalists at the 2003 Summer Universiade